Valibamey Vaa Vaa is a 1982 Indian Tamil-language film directed by Bharathiraja. The film stars Karthik and Radha. It was released on 14 November 1982.

Plot 
Karthik is a first class graduate but innocent and unsure about the ways of the world. His mum is the principal of the girls' school where Radha studies. She is a brat. She is often up to pranks and is scolded by the principal. She decides to teach her a lesson by trapping her son Karthik. She runs after him trying to lure him and in this process both really fall in love. She takes him to Kodaikanal for a picnic. Various incidents make Karthik realise that she is a go getter like she bashes up a gang of goons alone. He cannot drive horses but she can etc. He starts getting doubts about his own abilities. Radha keeps on chiding him for not being man enough. Her psychiatrist father keeps warning her not do that but she does not listen to him. Karthik also visits a dancer Jayamalini to assert his manliness but she advises him to become a sage as he is not up to her expectations. He tells his mother that he is renouncing everything and a huge function is arranged to make him attain sage hood. Radha realises her mistake and goes to him as a last resort all dressed up. She entices and instigates him enough to slap her and thrust himself upon her. In the end all becomes well and Radha falls at his feet to show that he is the boss. Karthik is good as an unsure inexperienced lover. Radha shows some acting prowess and emotions in the end.

Cast 
 Karthik
 Radha
 Goundamani
 Hafa Shareef
 Jayamalini
 A. R. Subramaniam
 Lavanya

Soundtrack 
The music was composed by Ilaiyaraaja.

Reception 
The film was not commercially successful.

References

External links 
 

1980s Tamil-language films
1982 films
Films directed by Bharathiraja
Films scored by Ilaiyaraaja